"My Mistake" is a song by English singer-songwriter Gabrielle Aplin, released on 28 November 2018 by Never Fade Records and AWAL as the lead single from her upcoming third studio album, Dear Happy (2020). Aplin co-wrote the song with Olivia Sebastianelli, alongside its producers Ash Howes and Seton Daunt. "My Mistake" is a piano ballad, with lyrics describing "embracing your flaws".

Track listing

Release history

References

Gabrielle Aplin songs
2018 singles
2018 songs
2010s ballads
Songs written by Ash Howes
Songs written by Seton Daunt
Songs written by Gabrielle Aplin